Paucará District is one of eight districts of the Acobamba Province in Peru.

Geography 
Other mountains are listed below:

Ethnic groups 
The people in the district are mainly Indigenous citizens of Quechua descent. Quechua is the language which the majority of the population (88.55%) learnt to speak in childhood, 11.31% of the residents started speaking using the Spanish language (2007 Peru Census).

References